The Hutun River is a river in Fujian Province, in the East China region of the People's Republic of China.

Geography
The Hutun's  drainage basin is within Fujian province.

The Hutun River's headwaters are in the Wuyi Mountains. It is a tributary of the Min River which flows into the Taiwan Strait.

See also
List of rivers of China

Min River (Fujian)

References

Rivers of Fujian
Nanping